The Hyderabad Race Club is a Thoroughbred Racing Association and the race track is at Malakpet, Hyderabad, Telangana, India. This race course is considered one of the top racecourses in India and was inaugurated by the 6th Nizam Mahbub Ali Khan.

History
Horse racing in Hyderabad was started by the Nizam Asaf Jah VI in 1868 at Moula-Ali. In those days the races were called Deccan races and later the Hyderabad races. In 1886 the racing shifted to Malakpet by H.H Nawab Mir Mahboob Ali Khan, Nizam VI as he wanted the race course to be near his palace. Hyderabad Race Club started its operations in 1961 in Secunderabad and shifted to Malakpet in 1968 when the racing was revived under Hyderabad Race Club.

Deccan Derby

An annual event, Deccan Derby is held here which attracts the best 3 year olds in the country and is always run on 2 October.

Other races
The other prestigious races are the President of India Gold Cup and the Nizam's Gold Cup, the Fillies Championship Stakes, the Colts Championship Stakes, which are run during the Monsoon Racing Season. Racing will be conducted from July to October called as Monsoon races and from November to February called Winter races.

References

External links

 Hyderabad Race Club official website
 Hyderabad Race Club history

Horse racing venues in India
Sports venues in Telangana
Sport in Telangana
Hyderabad State
Sports venues completed in 1868
1868 establishments in India